The 1998 Calder Cup playoffs of the American Hockey League began on April 14, 1998. The sixteen teams that qualified, eight from each conference, played best-of-five series for division semifinals and best-of-seven series for division finals and conference finals.  The conference champions played a best-of-seven series for the Calder Cup. The Calder Cup Final ended on June 10, 1998, with the Philadelphia Phantoms defeating the Saint John Flames four games to two to win the first Calder Cup in team history. Philadelphia's Mike Maneluk won the Jack A. Butterfield Trophy as the AHL playoff MVP.

The Philadelphia Phantoms set an AHL playoff record by winning 9 road games in one playoff year.

Playoff seeds
After the 1997–98 AHL regular season, 16 teams qualified for the playoffs. The top four teams from each division qualified for the playoffs. However, due to the uneven number of teams in the each conference, it was possible for the fifth-placed team in the five team divisions to crossover to the playoffs for the four team divisions. This could only happen if the fifth-placed team in a five team division earned more points than the fourth-placed team in the four team division in the same conference. In this case, the fifth-placed team from the five team division would play in place of the fourth-placed team from the four team division in that part of the playoff bracket. The Philadelphia Phantoms were the Western Conference regular season champions as well as the Macgregor Kilpatrick Trophy winners with the best overall regular season record. The Springfield Falcons were the Eastern Conference regular season champions.

Eastern Conference

Atlantic Division
Saint John Flames – 99 points
Fredericton Canadiens – 81 points
Portland Pirates – 80 points
St. John's Maple Leafs – 73 points

New England Division
Springfield Falcons – Eastern Conference regular season champions, 99 points
Hartford Wolf Pack – 99 points
Beast of New Haven – 85 points
Worcester IceCats – 83 points

Western Conference

Empire Division
Albany River Rats – 103 points
Hamilton Bulldogs – 94 points
Syracuse Crunch – 83 points
Adirondack Red Wings – 74 points
Rochester Americans – 72 points (Played in the Mid-Atlantic Division bracket by virtue of earning more points than the fourth-placed team in that division)

Mid-Atlantic Division
Philadelphia Phantoms – Western Conference regular season champions; Macgregor Kilpatrick Trophy winners, 106 points
Hershey Bears – 85 points
Kentucky Thoroughblades – 70 points

Bracket

In each round the team that earned more points during the regular season receives home ice advantage, meaning they receive the "extra" game on home-ice if the series reaches the maximum number of games. There is no set series format due to arena scheduling conflicts and travel considerations.

Division Semifinals
Note 1: All times are in Eastern Time (UTC−4).
Note 2: Game times in italics signify games to be played only if necessary.
Note 3: Home team is listed first.

Eastern Conference

Atlantic Division

(A1) Saint John Flames vs. (A4) St. John's Maple Leafs

(A2) Fredericton Canadiens vs. (A3) Portland Pirates

New England Division

(N1) Springfield Falcons vs. (N4) Worcester IceCats

(N2) Hartford Wolf Pack vs. (N3) Beast of New Haven

Western Conference

Empire Division

(E1) Albany River Rats vs. (E4) Adirondack Red Wings

(E2) Hamilton Bulldogs vs. (E3) Syracuse Crunch

Mid-Atlantic Division

(M1) Philadelphia Phantoms vs. (E5) Rochester Americans

(M2) Hershey Bears vs. (M3) Kentucky Thoroughblades

Division Finals

Eastern Conference

Atlantic Division

(A1) Saint John Flames vs. (A3) Portland Pirates

New England Division

(N2) Hartford Wolf Pack vs. (N4) Worcester IceCats

Western Conference

Empire Division

(E1) Albany River Rats vs. (E2) Hamilton Bulldogs

Mid-Atlantic Division

(M1) Philadelphia Phantoms vs. (M2) Hershey Bears

Conference finals

Eastern Conference

(N2) Hartford Wolf Pack vs. (A1) Saint John Flames

Western Conference

(M1) Philadelphia Phantoms vs. (E1) Albany River Rats

Calder Cup Final

(M1) Philadelphia Phantoms vs. (A1) Saint John Flames

See also
1997–98 AHL season
List of AHL seasons

References

Calder Cup
Calder Cup playoffs